Szarzyn  is a settlement in the administrative district of Gmina Bytów, within Bytów County, Pomeranian Voivodeship, in northern Poland.

The settlement has a population of 20.

References

Szarzyn